Obinna Ralph Ekezie (born August 22, 1975) is a Nigerian former professional basketball player who played in the NBA and other leagues. His name, Obinna, means "Father's heart". He is a direct descendant of the 19th century Igbo warrior and businessman Duruike Akubugali, hence hails from Obor Autonomous Community in Orlu Urban Local Government Area of Imo State.

Career
A 6'10" 270 lb center, Ekezie was selected with the 37th overall pick in the 1999 NBA Draft by the Vancouver Grizzlies after playing with the Maryland Terrapins from 1995–1999. Obinna prepared for college at Worcester Academy, graduating in 1995.

Ekezie played for five NBA teams (1999–2005), and also professionally with Red Star Belgrade (Serbia), Lottomatica Roma (Italy), and Dynamo Moscow. Ekezie was invited to Atlanta Hawks training camp where he was a leading scorer averaging 11.8 points on 48.8 field goal percentage. Ekezie then suffered an anterior cruciate ligament injury on October 13, 2005 in an exhibition game after landing awkwardly.

Ekezie is the founder of ZeepTravel and Wakanow, online businesses allowing travel services for those going to and from America and Africa.

Notes

External links
NBA.com player profile
College & NBA stats @ basketballreference.com
Dynamo player profile

1975 births
Living people
Sportspeople from Port Harcourt
Nigerian men's basketball players
Centers (basketball)
Worcester Academy alumni
Maryland Terrapins men's basketball players
Vancouver Grizzlies draft picks
Vancouver Grizzlies players
Washington Wizards players
Dallas Mavericks players
Los Angeles Clippers players
KK Crvena zvezda players
Columbus Riverdragons players
Atlanta Hawks players
Pallacanestro Virtus Roma players
BC Dynamo Moscow players
National Basketball Association players from Nigeria
ABA League players
Lega Basket Serie A players
1998 FIBA World Championship players
Nigerian expatriate basketball people in Italy
Nigerian expatriate basketball people in Serbia
Nigerian expatriate basketball people in the United States
Nigerian expatriate basketball people in Canada
Nigerian expatriate basketball people in Russia